Delesseria is a genus of red algae belonging to the family Delesseriaceae.

The genus has cosmopolitan distribution.

The genus name of Delesseria is in honour of Jules Paul Benjamin Delessert (1773–1847), who was a French banker and naturalist.

The genus was circumscribed by Jean Vincent Félix Lamouroux in Ann. Mus. Natl. Hist. Nat. Vol.20 on page 122 in 1813.

Known species
As of May 2021;
Delesseria baeri 
Delesseria crozetii 
Delesseria decipiens
Delesseria imbricata 
Delesseria montagnei 
Delesseria ocellata 
Delesseria sanguinea

References

Ceramiales
Red algae genera